Kate Wilhelm (June 8, 1928 –  March 8, 2018) was an American author. She wrote novels and stories in the science fiction, mystery, and suspense genres, including the Hugo Award–winning Where Late the Sweet Birds Sang. Wilhelm established the Clarion Workshop along with her husband Damon Knight and writer Robin Scott Wilson.

Life
Katie Gertrude Meredith was born in Toledo, Ohio, daughter of Jesse and Ann Meredith. She graduated from high school in Louisville, Kentucky, and worked as a model, telephone operator, sales clerk, switchboard operator, and underwriter for an insurance company.

She married Joseph Wilhelm in 1947 and had two sons. The couple divorced in 1962 and Wilhelm married Damon Knight in 1963. She and her husband lived in Eugene, Oregon, until his death in 2002 and she remained there until her own death in 2018.

Career
Her first published short fiction was "The Pint-Size Genie" in the October 1956 issue of Fantastic, edited by Paul W. Fairman (assisted by Cele Goldsmith, who was responsible for looking at unsolicited submissions to the magazine). The next year, her first accepted story, "The Mile-Long Spaceship", was published in John W. Campbell's Astounding Science Fiction, and ten of her speculative fiction stories were published during 1958 and 1959. Her debut novel was a murder mystery, More Bitter Than Death (Simon & Schuster, 1963), and her science fiction novel debut, The Clone (1965) by Wilhelm and Theodore L. Thomas, was a finalist for the annual Nebula Award.

Her work has been published in Quark/, Orbit, The Magazine of Fantasy and Science Fiction, Locus, Amazing Stories, Asimov's Science Fiction, Ellery Queen's Mystery Magazine, Fantastic, Omni, Alfred Hitchcock's Mystery Magazine, Redbook and Cosmopolitan.

She and her second husband, Damon Knight, mentored many authors and helped to establish the Clarion Writers Workshop and the Milford Writer's Workshop. After his death in 2002, Wilhelm continued to host monthly workshops, as well as lecturing at other events, until her death.

Recognition

The Science Fiction and Fantasy Hall of Fame inducted Wilhelm in 2003, its eighth class of two deceased and two living writers.

In 2009, she received one of three inaugural Solstice Awards from the Science Fiction and Fantasy Writers of America (founded by Knight in 1965), which recognize "significant impact on the science fiction or fantasy landscape".

The Nebula Award trophy was designed for the first awards by J. A. Lawrence, based on a sketch by Wilhelm.

She also won a few annual genre awards for particular works:

 Nebula Award for Best Short Story, 1968, "The Planners"
 Hugo Award for Best Novel and Locus Award for Best Novel, both 1977, Where Late the Sweet Birds Sang
 Nebula Award for Best Novelette, 1986, "The Girl Who Fell into the Sky"
 Nebula Award for Best Short Story, 1987, "Forever Yours, Anna"
 Hugo Award (best related book) and Locus Award (best nonfiction), both 2006, Storyteller: Writing Lessons and More from 27 Years of the Clarion Writers' Workshop (Small Beer Press, 2005)

The Hugo- and Locus Award-winning novel Where Late the Sweet Birds Sang was also a finalist for the Nebula Award, winner of the short-lived Jupiter Award from science fiction instructors, and third place for the academic John W. Campbell Memorial Award for Best Science Fiction Novel.

In 2016, the SFWA renamed the Solstice Award the Kate Wilhelm Solstice Award.

Works

Barbara Holloway mysteries

Holloway is an attorney in Eugene, Oregon. She and her semi-retired lawyer father, Frank Holloway, solve mysteries that combine detective fiction with courtroom drama.

Death Qualified: A Mystery of Chaos (1991)
The Best Defense (1994)
For the Defense also named Malice Prepense in hardbound editions (1996)
Defense for the Devil (1999)
No Defense (2000)
Desperate Measures (2001)
Clear and Convincing Proof (2003)
The Unbidden Truth (2004)
Sleight Of Hand (2006)
A Wrongful Death (2007)
Cold Case (2008)
Heaven is High (2011)
By Stone, By Blade, By Fire (2012)
Mirror, Mirror (2017)

Constance Leidl and Charlie Meiklejohn mysteries

Meiklejohn is a former arson detective turned private investigator. His wife, Leidl, is a professional psychologist. Together they solve cases.
The Hamlet Trap (1987)
The Dark Door (1988)
Smart House (1989)
Sweet, Sweet Poison (1990)
Seven Kinds of Death (1992)
Whisper Her Name (2012)

Collections
A Flush of Shadows: Five Short Novels (1995) – includes "With Thimbles, With Forks, and Hope", "Torch Song", "All for One", "Sister Alice", and "Gorgon Fields"
The Casebook of Constance and Charlie Volume 1 (1999) – includes "The Hamlet Trap", "Smart House", and "Seven Kinds of Death"
The Casebook of Constance and Charlie Volume 2 (2000) – includes "Sweet, Sweet Poison" and "The Dark Door", plus shorter stories "Christ's Tears", "Torch Song", and "An Imperfect Gift"

Short Stories in Ellery Queen Mystery Magazine
"Christ's Tears" April 1996
"An Imperfect Gift" Aug 1999
"His Deadliest Enemy" Mar/Apr2004

Standalone mystery/suspense novels
 More Bitter Than Death (1962)
 The Clewiston Test (1976)
 Fault Lines (1977)
 Oh, Susannah! (1982)
 Justice for Some (1993)
 The Good Children (1998)
 The Deepest Water (2000)
 Skeletons: A Novel of Suspense (2002)
 The Price of Silence (2005)
 Death of an Artist (2012)

Non-fiction
 Storyteller: Writing Lessons & More from 27 Years of the Clarion Writers' Workshop (2005)

Poems
 Alternatives (1980)
 Four Seasons (1980)
 No One Listens (1980)
 The Eagle (1980)

Editor
 Clarion SF – anthology of 15 short stories by authors such as Damon Knight, Robert Crais, and Vonda N. McIntyre
 Nebula Award Stories 9 - anthology of Nebula Award-winning and nominated stories

SF novels, noted stories and collections

 The Mile-Long Spaceship (1963)
 The Clone (1965) – 1966 Nebula Award nominee, Best Novel
 The Nevermore Affair (1966)
 Andover and the Android (1966)
 Baby, You Were Great (1967) – 1968 Nebula Award nominee, Best Short Story
 The Killing Thing (1967)
 The Planners (1968) – 1969 Nebula Award winner, Best Short Story
 The Downstairs Room (1968) – collection of 14 SF short stories
 Let the Fire Fall (1969)
 The Year of the Cloud (1970)
 April Fool's Day Forever (1970) – 1971 Nebula Award nominee, Best Novella
 A Cold Dark Night with Snow (1970) – 1971 Nebula Award nominee, Best Short Story
 Abyss: Two Novellas (1971) – contains "The Plastic Abyss" (1992 Nebula Award nominee, Best Novella) and "Stranger in the House"
 Margaret and I (1971) -1972 Nebula Award nominee, Best Novel
 City of Cain (1974)
 The Infinity Box (1975) – collection of 9 SF short stories, including 1992 Nebula Award nominee "The Infinity Box", for Best Novella
 Where Late the Sweet Birds Sang (1976) – Hugo and Locus Award winner; Nebula nominee, Best Novel
 Somerset Dreams and Other Fiction (1978) – collection of 8 shorter SF stories/novellas
 Juniper Time (1979) – 1980 Nebula Award nominee, Best Novel
 The Winter Beach (1981) – 1982 Nebula Award nominee, Best Novella
 A Sense of Shadow (1981)
 Listen, Listen (1981) – contains four novellas: "Julian", "With Thimbles, With Forks and Hope", "Moongate", and "The Uncertain Edge of Reality"
 Welcome, Chaos (1983)
 Huysman's Pets (1985)
 Forever Yours, Anna (1987) – 1988 Nebula Award winner, Best Short Story
 Crazy Time (1988)
 Children of the Wind (1989) – contains "Children of the Wind", "The Gorgon Field" (1986 Nebula Award nominee, Best Novella), "A Brother to Dragons, A Companion of Owls", "The Blue Ladies", and "The Girl Who Fell into the Sky" (1987 Nebula Award winner, Best Novelette)
 Cambio Bay (1990)
 Naming the Flowers (1992) – 1994 Nebula Award nominee, Best Novella
 And the Angels Sing (1992) – collection of 12 SF short stories
 I Know What You're Thinking (1994) – 1995 Nebula Award nominee, Best Short Story
 Fear is a Cold Black (2010) – collection of Wilhelm's early SF short stories
 Music Makers (2012) – collection of 5 stories: "Music Makers", "Shadows on the Wall of the Cave", "Mockingbird", "The Late Night Train", and "An Ordinary Day with Jason"
 The Bird Cage (2012) – collection of 4 stories: "The Bird Cage", "Changing the World", "The Fountain of Neptune", and "Rules of the Game"

See also

References

External links
 Former official website at the Internet Archive
 
 
"Baby, You Were Great" (1967) by Wilhelm, LoA reprint including story notes and an illustration by Ed Emshwiller
 Infinity Box Press, Wilhelm's publishing company
 Kate Wilhelm at Library of Congress Authorities — with 58 catalog records
 Guide to the Kate Wilhelm Papers at the University of Oregon
 Battistella, Maureen Flanagan,Kate Wilhelm (1928-2018), Oregon Encyclopedia

 

1928 births
2018 deaths
20th-century American novelists
20th-century American women writers
21st-century American novelists
21st-century American women writers
American fantasy writers
American mystery writers
American psychological fiction writers
American science fiction writers
American women novelists
Hugo Award-winning writers
Nebula Award winners
Novelists from Ohio
Novelists from Oregon
Science Fiction Hall of Fame inductees
The Magazine of Fantasy & Science Fiction people
Women mystery writers
Women science fiction and fantasy writers
Writers from Eugene, Oregon
Writers from Toledo, Ohio